Eastern League may refer to:

Baseball in the United States
Most recent leagues listed first
 Eastern League (1938–present), a minor league established in 1923 and renamed Eastern League in 1938, at the Double-A level
 Eastern League (1916–1932), a minor league that last operated at the Class B and Class A levels
 Eastern League (1892–1911), operating name of the International League before 1912
 Eastern League (1884–1887), a minor league that was absorbed into the International League

Other uses
 Eastern League (Japanese baseball), one of two professional baseball minor leagues in Japan
 Eastern Football Netball League, an Australian rules football league
 Eastern Football League (Scotland), a Scottish non-league football league
 Eastern Professional Basketball League, an early name of the Continental Basketball Association
 Eastern Professional Soccer League (1928–29), an American soccer league 
 Eastern Hockey League, an American professional ice hockey minor league

See also 
 Eastern Football League (disambiguation)